Patrick Dougherty (born 1844, date of death unknown) was a Union Navy sailor in the American Civil War and a recipient of the U.S. military's highest decoration, the Medal of Honor, for his actions at the Battle of Mobile Bay.

Born in 1844 in Ireland, Dougherty immigrated to the United States and was living in New York when he joined the U.S. Navy. Dougherty voluntarily took over the powder boy's duties, supplying gunpowder to his artillery piece throughout the battle. For this action, he was awarded the Medal of Honor four months later, on December 31, 1864.

Dougherty's official Medal of Honor citation reads:
As a landsman on board the U.S.S. Lackawanna, Dougherty acted gallantly without orders when the powder boy at his gun was disabled under the heavy enemy fire, and maintained a supply of powder throughout the prolonged action. Dougherty also aided in the attacks on Fort Morgan and in the capture of the prize ram Tennessee.

References 

1844 births
Year of death unknown
Irish emigrants to the United States (before 1923)
Irish sailors in the United States Navy
People of New York (state) in the American Civil War
Union Navy sailors
Irish-born Medal of Honor recipients
United States Navy Medal of Honor recipients
American Civil War recipients of the Medal of Honor